Nobody Lives Forever may refer to:

Nobody Lives for Ever, a James Bond novel, released as Nobody Lives Forever in the U.S.
Nobody Lives Forever (film), a 1946 film starring John Garfield
Nobody Lives Forever (1998 film), a TV film starring Brenda Bakke
"Nobody Lives Forever", an episode of the Miami Vice television series

See also
The Operative: No One Lives Forever, a 2000 video game